Mazatenango is a city with a population of 77,431 (as of 2018) and a municipality in the Suchitepéquez department of Guatemala. It is the capital of Suchitepéquez department and is located 165km from Guatemala City.

It lies significantly lower in elevation than Guatemala City or Quetzaltenango. It sits on the coastal plain leading to the Pacific Ocean. The climate is hotter and more humid than that of the other cities in the higher elevations.

Carnival
During the month of February, Mazatenango holds its eight-day Carnival Feast, with food, music, parades, and games.

Arts and crafts 
Mazatenango is a major producer of gold, silver, tile, fabric, and furniture. It is also a major commercial centre for the economy. This region provides many of the products tourists buy at the markets. Goods are shipped to other cities via the Pacific Coast Highway which runs through the city.

Sports
Mazatenango is home to Guatemala's top division football side CD Suchitepéquez. The players play at the Estadio Carlos Salazar Hijo in the Santa Cristina neighborhood.

Language
Mazatenango speaks Spanish and Kich’e.

References

Municipalities of the Suchitepéquez Department